Nasrollah Abdollahi (born 2 September 1951 in Tehran, Iran) is an Iranian football coach and former player.

Playing career

Club career
Abdollahi played for Guard F.C. before he changed to Taj SC. There he could win the Iranian league in 1971 as well as the second place in 1974. Also he won AFC Champions League 1970 with Taj SC. in 1970

After playing for Rah Ahan F.C. for two years he joined Shahbaz F.C., where he played many successful years reaching the third place in the Iranian league in 1976/77 and winning the Tehran Cup in 1981.

International career
Abdollahi participated in 1976 Olympics in Montreal, when Iran reached the quarterfinals. He also played all three matches of Team Melli at the 1978 World Cup. Abdollahi was capped 39 times for the Iranian national team between 1976 and 1980; he won the 1976 Asian Cup in Iran and captained the team to third place in the 1980 Asian Cup in Kuwait.

Coaching career
For a brief period during Nasser Hejazi's time as Esteghlal F.C. manager, Abdollahi was the assistant manager.

References

External links

Iranian footballers
Association football defenders
Iran international footballers
Rah Ahan players
Homa F.C. players
Esteghlal F.C. players
shahin FC players
Esteghlal F.C. managers
1976 AFC Asian Cup players
1980 AFC Asian Cup players
Footballers at the 1976 Summer Olympics
1978 FIFA World Cup players
AFC Asian Cup-winning players
People from Ahvaz
1951 births
Living people
Olympic footballers of Iran
Iranian football managers
Sportspeople from Khuzestan province